Grossera is a plant genus of the family Euphorbiaceae first described as a genus in 1903. It is native to Madagascar and to mainland tropical Africa. It is dioecious.

Species
 Grossera angustifolia Barbera&Riina - Equatorial Guinea
 Grossera elongata Hutch.  - Príncipe
 Grossera glomeratospicata J.Léonard - East Congo
 Grossera macrantha Pax - East Congo, West Congo, Cameroon, Central African Rep.
 Grossera major Pax - Cameroon
 Grossera multinervis J.Léonard - East Congo, São Tomé
 Grossera paniculata Pax - West Congo, Cameroon, Gabon
 Grossera perrieri Leandri - Madagascar
 Grossera vignei Hoyle - Ivory Coast, Ghana, West Congo

formerly included
moved to Cavacoa 
 G. aurea - Cavacoa aurea 
 G. baldwinii - Cavacoa baldwinii  
 G. quintasii - Cavacoa quintasii

References

Aleuritideae
Flora of Africa
Euphorbiaceae genera
Dioecious plants